Going Places is an American television sitcom that aired on ABC from September 21, 1990, to March 8, 1991. The series stars Alan Ruck, Jerry Levine, Heather Locklear, and Hallie Todd as four young Hollywood writers renting a house together. It aired as part of the TGIF block. The series was created and executive produced by Robert Griffard and Howard Adler, and developed and executive produced by Thomas L. Miller and Robert L. Boyett for Miller-Boyett Productions, in association with Lorimar Television.

Cast
The four writers
 Alan Ruck as Charlie Davis
 Jerry Levine as Jack Davis and Charlie's brother
 Heather Locklear as Alexandra "Alex" Burton
 Hallie Todd as Kate Griffin

Supporting cast
 Holland Taylor as Dawn St. Claire, producer for the hidden camera television show Here's Looking at You
 Staci Keanan as Lindsay Bowen, a teenager who lives next door to the four writers
 J.D. Daniels as Nick Griffin, Kate's nephew
 Steve Vinovich as Dick Roberts, a daytime talk show host
 Philip Charles MacKenzie as Arnie Ross, Dick Roberts' producer

Episodes

Broadcast and ratings
Going Places premiered on September 21, 1990 as the end of ABC's newly successful TGIF lineup, in the Friday 9:30/8:30c slot (#41). The series was officially canceled in May 1991. The series returned on May 31, 1991 for six weeks of summer reruns (mostly of the episodes aired after the concept and character revamp), and last aired on July 5, 1991 (#34).

References
 Brooks, Tim; Marsh, Earle. The Complete Directory to Prime Time Network and Cable TV Shows 1946–Present, Random House, 2003.

External links
 
 

1990 American television series debuts
1991 American television series endings
1990s American sitcoms
American Broadcasting Company original programming
English-language television shows
Television shows set in Los Angeles
Television series about television
Television series by Lorimar Television
TGIF (TV programming block)